Locustellonyssus is a genus of mites in the family Rhinonyssidae. There are at least two described species in Locustellonyssus.

Species
These two species belong to the genus Locustellonyssus:
 Locustellonyssus amurensis Bregetova, 1965
 Locustellonyssus sibiricus Butenko & Stanyukovich, 2001

References

Rhinonyssidae
Articles created by Qbugbot